Topoli (in Persian: تپلی, literally: The Fatty) is a 1972 Iranian film directed by Reza Mirlohi. Morteza Aghili and Homayun play the main characters of the film. The script is based on the novel Of Mice and Men by John Steinbeck. The film is dedicated to John Steinbeck. The character of Topoli is loosely based on Lennie Small of Of Mice and Men as Essi is the Iranian version of George Milton in the novel.

Plot
Topoli is an intellectually disabled fat man who lives with his cousin Essi. Topoli is interested in touching soft materials. His assault to their employer's daughter while attempting to touch her skirt causes them to have to run away. They are then employed in a wood-cutting factory in the north of Iran. The factory owner's wife seduces Topoli and he suffocates her unintentionally. Topoli and Essi rush into the jungle and the workers come after them. Bashir, the head-worker, is killed when he wants to side with them. Essi doesn't want Topoli to be tortured by the pursuing workers, so he shoots him, to spare him from suffering a worse fate.

Cast
Homayun as Topoli
Morteza Aghili as Essi (Esmail)
Zakaria Hashemi as Bashir
Zari Khoshkam as The factory owner's wife
Nematollah Gorji as Mirhosein
Bahram Vatanparast as The factory owner

Notes

External links
Topoli in Internet Movie Database

1972 films
Films based on American novels
1972 drama films
Films based on works by John Steinbeck
1970s Persian-language films
Of Mice and Men
Iranian drama films
Iranian black-and-white films